Tharaka Gunawardena (born 27 January 1995) is a Sri Lankan cricketer. He made his Twenty20 debut on 14 January 2020, for Lankan Cricket Club in the 2019–20 SLC Twenty20 Tournament. He made his first-class debut on 28 February 2020, for Kandy Customs Cricket Club in Tier B of the 2019–20 Premier League Tournament.

References

External links
 

1995 births
Living people
Sri Lankan cricketers
Kandy Customs Sports Club cricketers
Lankan Cricket Club cricketers
Place of birth missing (living people)